The Woods College of Advancing Studies is one of the eight constituent colleges and schools of Boston College. It offers flexible undergraduate, graduate, and certificate programs, as well as non-degree coursework, for non-traditional students.

Woods College demands of its students the same high standards in academics, moral character, and commitment to the betterment of society as is required of all of Boston College's traditional undergraduate and graduate students. For this reason the same degree bestowed upon the students in Morrissey College is awarded to students in Woods College upon successful completion of degree requirements.

History
Founded in 1929, Woods College's roots can be traced back to the establishment of Boston College Law School in the late 1920s. A "Downtown Center," which later became known as the Junior College in downtown Boston, was formed as a collaboration between the law school and Graduate School as a way to provide educational opportunities for those with only a high school diploma or the less than two years of college coursework needed to enter the law school. A special program of study was offered in the late afternoon and evening in such courses as English, accounting, economics, public speaking, modern languages, psychology, ethics, government, and sociology. Another evening program, which offered the equivalent of a four-year college course leading to a Bachelor of Arts (A.B.) degree, became known as the Extension School under the direction of the Graduate School. In September 1935, the two program merged in new quarters at 126 Newbury Street in Boston, where it became known as Intown College and later in the late 1950s, the Evening College.

In 1996, the college's name was changed from the Evening College to the College of Advancing Studies to reflect its evolving mission and expanded academic program that included both bachelor's and master's degrees.

In May 2002, the College of Advancing Studies was renamed, through a private donation with naming rights, by University trustee and businessman Robert M. Devlin and his wife Katharine B., in honor of its dean, James A. Woods, S.J., who had served since 1968 as the University's longest-ever serving dean.

Notable alumni
Marty Walsh, BA '09, Secretary of Labor.

References

Boston College
Educational institutions established in 1929
1929 establishments in Massachusetts